The Clairton City School District is a diminutive, suburban, public school district. The Clairton City School District encompasses approximately  serving the City of Clairton in Allegheny County, Pennsylvania. According to 2000 federal census data, it served a resident population of 8,491. By 2010, the district's population declined to 6,797 people. In 2009, Clairton City School District residents' per capita income was $14,608, while the median family income was $31,539. In the Commonwealth, the median family income was $49,501 and the United States median family income was $49,445, in 2010.

Clairton City School District operates Clairton Middle School High School (7th-12th) and Clairton Elementary School (K-6th) both housed in a single building.

Extracurriculars
Clairton City School District offers a variety of clubs, activities, community outreach programs, and sports.

Sports
The District funds:

Boys
Baseball - A
Basketball- A
Football - A
Track and Field - AA

Girls
Basketball - A
Cheer - AAAA
Track and Field - AA

Middle School Sports

Boys
Basketball

Girls
Basketball

According to PIAA directory July 2013

References

School districts in Allegheny County, Pennsylvania
Education in Pittsburgh area